Michael Tow is an American actor, director and producer. He is best known for his work on Lucky Grandma, Blindspot and Unfinished Business.

Life and career
Tow was born in Boston, Massachusetts. He is married with three daughters.

Tow's theater credits include Chinglish at Lyric Stage Company of Boston, Wild Swans at the American Repertory Theater and Proof at Central Sq Theater.

Filmography

As Actor

References

External links
 

Living people
American male television actors
American male film actors
21st-century American male actors
American male stage actors
Male actors from Massachusetts
Year of birth missing (living people)